Monarrhenus is a genus of plants in the sunflower family.

Species include:
 Monarrhenus pinifolius Cass.
 Monarrhenus salicifolius Cass.

References

Inuleae
Asteraceae genera